Shahid Chomani (also Romanized as Shahīd Chomanī) is a village in Karasf Rural District, in the Central District of Khodabandeh County, Zanjan Province, Iran. At the 2006 census, its population was 444, in 92 families.

References 

Populated places in Khodabandeh County